Chris Bergin is a Gaelic footballer from County Laois.

References
2003 All-Ireland Minor final report
Irish Independent All Ireland Minor final replay report 2003

Year of birth missing (living people)
Living people
Laois inter-county Gaelic footballers
The Heath Gaelic footballers